The 1957 season was the Chicago Bears' 38th in the National Football League. The team failed to improve on their 9–2–1 record from 1956 and finished with a 5–7 record under second-year head coach Paddy Driscoll, one year after making the championship game. The 47–7 loss in that game, coupled with a 5–7 season, compelled owner George Halas to reassign Driscoll in February and return as head coach in 1958.

Schedule 

 Saturday night (October 5)

Standings

Roster

Season summary

Week 1 at Packers

References 

Chicago Bears
Chicago Bears seasons
Chicago Bears